In metallurgy, the Bower–Barff process is a method of coating iron or steel with magnetic iron oxide, such as Fe2O4, in order to minimize atmospheric corrosion.

The articles to be treated are put into a closed retort and a current of superheated steam passed through for twenty minutes followed by a current of producer gas (carbon monoxide), to reduce any higher oxides that may have been formed.

References 
ebook of creative chemistry, page 273.

Metallurgical processes